Horacio Ignacio Matuszyczk (born 29 November 1961) is an Argentine football manager and former player who played as a forward. He is the current manager of Venezuelan club Hermanos Colmenarez.

Playing career
He left the club in 1982, and subsequently played for Racing Club, Defensa y Justicia and Temperley before moving abroad with Chilean side Unión Española in 1987.

In 1992, after three years at Cobresal and one season at Deportes La Serena, Matuszyczk moved to Venezuela with Minervén. He retired at the country, while playing for Marítimo de Venezuela.

Managerial career
Matuszyczk began his managerial career in 2004, while in charge of Venezuelan side Iberoamericano. Ahead of the 2007–08 season, he became manager of Minervén Bolívar after the club replaced Iberoamericano in the Segunda División.

Matuszyczk left Minervén in September 2007, and was presented as manager of Monagas in March of the following year. In 2009, he took over Angostura FC in the second division, leaving for a short period in late 2011 before returning in March 2012.

In 2012, Matuszyczk replaced Edson Tortolero ahead of Tucanes de Amazonas, freshly relegated from the Primera División. He led the club back to the top tier as champions, and was named manager of fellow first division side Trujillanos on 31 May 2014.

Matuszyczk left Trujillanos on 10 May 2016, and was announced as manager of Portuguesa on 6 June. He was sacked the following 22 February, and returned to Trujillanos on 11 September 2017. He resigned on 23 November 2018, being immediately announced at Mineros de Guayana.

On 16 August 2019, Matuszyczk was sacked by Mineros. He remained nearly three years without coaching before taking over Hermanos Colmenarez on 26 July 2022.

Honours

Player
Boca Juniors
Argentine Primera División: 1981

Manager
Tucanes de Amazonas
Venezuelan Segunda División: 2012–13

References

External links

1961 births
Living people
People from Santa Fe Province
Argentine people of Polish descent
Argentine footballers
Association football forwards
Argentine Primera División players
Boca Juniors footballers
Racing Club de Avellaneda footballers
Defensa y Justicia footballers
Club Atlético Temperley footballers
Unión Española footballers
Cobresal footballers
Deportes La Serena footballers
Minervén S.C. players
C.S. Marítimo de Venezuela players
Argentine expatriate footballers
Argentine expatriate sportspeople in Chile
Argentine expatriate sportspeople in Venezuela
Expatriate footballers in Chile
Expatriate footballers in Venezuela
Argentine football managers
Venezuelan Primera División managers
Venezuelan Segunda División managers
Monagas S.C. managers
Trujillanos FC managers
Portuguesa F.C. managers
Mineros de Guayana managers
C.D. Hermanos Colmenarez managers
Argentine expatriate football managers
Expatriate football managers in Venezuela
Angostura F.C. managers